The manga Captain Tsubasa was written and illustrated by Yōichi Takahashi. The series focuses on the development of a young Japanese football soccer player named Tsubasa Oozora who joins the Nankatsu elementary school's football team. The series was serialized in Shueisha's magazine Weekly Shōnen Jump between 1981 and 1988. 

It was collected in a total of 37 tankōbon volumes that were published between January 1982 and March 1989. In 1997, Shueisha started rereleasing the series in bunkoban volumes. They were rereleased from December 8, 1997 to February 18, 1999. Takahashi also wrote multiple sequels in the following years that followed Tsubasa's career.

Volume list

References

Captain Tsubasa